Mahala Lagoon is a small salty lagoon in the Tuzly Lagoons group, Ukraine. The total area is 76 ha. It is located west of the Shahany Lagoon, near the village Tryhatky, Tatarbunary Raion of Odessa Oblast. From the Shahany Lagoon it is separated by a sandbar.

The name of the lagoon originates from Arabic mähallä, from the root meaning "to settle", "to occupy".

References

Sources
 Starushenko L.I., Bushuyev S.G. (2001) Prichernomorskiye limany Odeschiny i ih rybohoziaystvennoye znacheniye. Astroprint, Odessa, 151 pp. 

Tuzly Lagoons